Shiva Kotwani is an Indian politician and member of the Bharatiya Janata Party. Kotwani was a member of the Madhya Pradesh Legislative Assembly from 1993 to 1998 from the Ujjain Dakshin constituency in Ujjain district.

References 

People from Ujjain
Bharatiya Janata Party politicians from Madhya Pradesh
Madhya Pradesh MLAs 1993–1998
Living people
Year of birth missing (living people)